Emma Ciardi (1879–1933) was an Italian painter.

Biography
Ciardi was born in Venice. Following in the footsteps of her father Guglielmo and brother Beppe, Emma Ciardi began painting as an adolescent and exhibited for the first time in 1900 at the Exposition Universelle in Paris, and at the Promotrice in Turin; in 1903 she participated in the Esposizione Internazionale d’Arte di Venezia and took part in it almost every year after that until 1932. In addition to her landscapes and views of Venice, she also soon made a name for herself with neo-18th-century subjects which were particularly well received by the English and American public. In 1910 she organised her first solo exhibition at the Leicester Galleries in London, followed by a second in 1913; she also had other exhibitions mounted in London by the Fine Art Society in 1928 and 1933. In the USA market she received acclaim from 1923 onwards, when she exhibited at the Howard Young Gallery in New York City, which obtained exclusive rights to selling her work. She died in Venice in 1933.

Two years after her death, Ciardi’s painting was celebrated in a retrospective on the occasion of the fortieth anniversary of the Venice Biennale.

Gallery

References

 Laura Casone, Emma Ciardi, online catalogue Artgate by Fondazione Cariplo, 2010, CC BY-SA (source for the first revision of this article).

External links

1879 births
1933 deaths
19th-century Italian painters
20th-century Italian painters
Italian women painters
Painters from Venice
20th-century Italian women artists
19th-century Italian women artists